Luis Felipe Tovar (born December 2, 1959, in Puebla) is a Mexican performance teacher and actor.

He studied in the Theatre Fine Arts School of Mexico and in the Escuela Internacional de Cine y Televisión de La Habana in Cuba.

He has been awarded three times with the Ariel Award: 1993, Principio y Fin, 1995, El Callejón de los Milagros and 1997, Sin remitente.

In 2003 he left his old school of performance to open the bar Muxe, whose clients are mainly homosexuals. He has a son named Timoteo and a daughter named Maria Fernanda. He played in telenovela Por Ti.

Films
 Mi secreto (2022)
 Malverde: El Santo Patrón (2021) .... TBA
 El carnaval de Sodoma (2006)
 patrulla 81 the movie (2005)
 El bulto para presidente (2005)
 Gente común (2006)
 Una de balazos (2005) .... El Carnal
 Isy (2005)
 Ver, oir y callar (2005)
 De ángeles, flores y fuentes (2005) .... Joel Villaseñor
 Superhéroe (2004)
 7 mujeres, un homosexual y Carlos (2004) .... Jefe
 @Festivbercine.ron (2004)
 Un diluvio (2004)
 Ciudad de perros (2004)
 La mudanza (2003)
 Fantasías (2003) .... Miguel
 La hija del caníbal (2003) .... Borracho
 Pandillero traficante (2003)
 Esclavo y amo (2003) .... Ricardo
 Asesinato en lunes de carnaval (2002)
 The Virgin of Lust (2002) .... Nacho
 Vivir mata (2002) .... Chepe
 Barrio 13, Part 2 (2002)
 Atlético San Pancho (2001) .... Claudio
 De la calle (2001) .... Chicharra
 The Mexican (2001)
 Cuando seas mia (2001)
 Santo: Infraterrestre (2001) .... Comandante Sarmiento
 Nuria y el fantasma (2001)
 Buitres al acecho 
  Por Ti (2001)
 La perdición de los hombres (2000)
 Así es la vida (2000) .... Nicolás
 Beat (2000) .... Federale Sergeant
 Barrio 13 al desnudo (2000)
 El carretonero(2000)
 Entre la tarde y la noche (1999)
 Santitos (1999) .... Doroteo
 Circuito interior (1999)
 Todo el poder (1999) .... Comandante Eleuterio 'Elvis' Quijano
 Superstition (1999) .... Pachucocodrilo
 Maldito amor: Demasiado tarde (1999)
 Luces de la noche (1998)
 Justo como en una película porno (1998)
 Mujer ladina (1998)
 Wash and Wear (1998)
 Men with Guns (1997) .... Barbero
 Los vuelcos del corazón (1996)
 La nave de los sueños (1996)
 Parejas (1996)
 Victoria (1996)
 Overkill (1996) .... Desk Clerk
 La ley de las mujeres (1995) .... Mario
 Sin remitente (1995) .... Luis Felipe
 Bienvenido-Welcome (1995) .... José Molina/León de la Lama
 Dos crímenes (1995) .... Invitado 1
 El callejón de los milagros (1995) .... Güicho
 Félix, como el gato (1995)
 Cilantro y perejil (1995) .... Pablo
 La orilla de la tierra (1994)
 The Beginning and the End (1993) .... César
 Se equivocó la cigueña (1993)
 El bulto (1992) .... Alfonso
 Ciudad de ciegos (1991) .... Gandalla
 Como fui a enamorarme de ti (1991)
 Futuro sangriento (1991)
 La ciudad al desnudo (1989) .... El King
 Un verano para la ballena (1988)
 El misterio de la araña (1986)
 Tacos de oro (1985) .... Marciano
 Tacos yum
 El recluso (Serie tv 2018)

External links
 Luis Felipe Tovar at Biosstars International
 

1961 births
Ariel Award winners
Living people
People from Puebla
Mexican male film actors
Mexican male telenovela actors